Ronald Joseph Mariano (born October 31, 1946) is an American politician currently serving as the Speaker of the Massachusetts House of Representatives. A Democrat from Quincy, he was first elected to the House in a December 1991 special election. He was appointed assistant majority leader in February 2009 and was appointed majority leader in January 2011 by then-speaker Robert DeLeo, who he succeeded as speaker upon DeLeo's retirement in 2020. He represents the 3rd Norfolk district.

Mariano was born and raised in Quincy, where he attended public school. He received his B.S. from Northeastern University in Boston and his M.Ed. from the University of Massachusetts Boston. He became a teacher and was elected to the Quincy School Committee, where he served from 1989 to 2009. He also served on the Ward 2 Democratic Committee, the Norfolk County Advisory Board, and the Quincy College Board of Governors.

References

Further reading

External links 
 "Ronald Mariano". Massachusetts General Court.
 "Public Officers of the Commonwealth of Massachusetts (2007–2008)". Massachusetts General Court.
  (campaign website)

|-

1946 births
21st-century American politicians
Living people
Politicians from Quincy, Massachusetts
Northeastern University alumni
University of Massachusetts Boston alumni
Speakers of the Massachusetts House of Representatives
Democratic Party members of the Massachusetts House of Representatives